Crazy! Baby is an album by the American jazz organist Jimmy Smith, recorded in 1960 and released by Blue Note. It was the first album Smith recorded at Rudy Van Gelder's studio in Englewood Cliffs, New Jersey.

Reception
The AllMusic review by Scott Yanow stated:

Track listing
 "When Johnny Comes Marching Home" (Traditional) – 7:58
 "Makin' Whoopee" (Walter Donaldson, Gus Kahn) – 4:57
 "A Night in Tunisia" (Dizzy Gillespie) – 5:40
 "Sonnymoon for Two" (Sonny Rollins) – 7:15
 "Mack the Knife" (Bertolt Brecht, Kurt Weill) – 4:58
 "What's New?" (Bob Haggart, Johnny Burke) – 3:50
 "Alfredo" (Jimmy Smith) – 4:30
 "If I Should Lose You" (Ralph Rainger, Leo Robin) – 6:26 Bonus track on CD reissue
 "When Lights Are Low" (Benny Carter, Spencer Williams) – 5:38 Bonus track on CD reissue

Personnel

Musicians
 Jimmy Smith – organ
 Quentin Warren – guitar
 Donald Bailey – drums

Technical
 Alfred Lion – producer
 Rudy Van Gelder – engineer
 Reid Miles – design
 Bob Ganley – photography
 Leonard Feather – liner notes

References

Blue Note Records albums
Jimmy Smith (musician) albums
1960 albums
Albums produced by Alfred Lion
Albums recorded at Van Gelder Studio